This article is a list of diseases of mangos (Mangifera indica).

Bacterial diseases

Fungal diseases

Nematodes, parasitic

Miscellaneous diseases and disorders

References
Common Names of Diseases, The American Phytopathological Society

Mango